Naked City is an album by John Zorn, released on Elektra Nonesuch in February 1990. The band assembled by Zorn for the album would later be known as Naked City. The album is characterized by its covers of movie themes and its fusion of various musical genres.

Content 
The group Zorn assembled for the material recorded on Naked City would later become a band in its own right known under the same name; the lineup was Zorn on alto saxophone with Bill Frisell on guitar, Wayne Horvitz on keyboards, Fred Frith on bass and Joey Baron on drums. The group was established in 1988 as a "compositional workshop" to test the limitations of a rock band format.

The album consists of several covers of movie themes, one jazz standard, and original compositions by Zorn, including several "hardcore miniatures" which would later be compiled on the album Torture Garden. The project, especially on this album, was noted for wildly juxtaposing various musical genres in rapid succession.

The album's cover art features Weegee's 1940 photograph "Corpse With Revolver"; Weegee's 1945 book gave the band its name. Also featured are macabre illustrations by manga artist Maruo Suehiro.

Release
The album was released by Elektra Nonesuch, which Zorn had previously released albums for; the subsequent releases of the Naked City group would be released on smaller labels like Shimmy Disc, and Zorn's own Tzadik and Avant labels.

The album was later rereleased as part of the box set Naked City: The Complete Studio Recordings on Tzadik Records in 2005.

Reception

The AllMusic review by Scott Yanow awarded the album 5 stars stating "The stimulating music rewards repeated listenings by more open-minded listeners."

Jon Pareles observed in The New York Times that "Mr. Zorn doesn't bother with transitions. While he and his musicians create every sudden textural shift themselves, without technological assistance, his guides are the splice, the jump cut, the video edit - not to mention the jack-in-the-box and its more sinister relatives in funhouses and horror movies. In his music, coherence is barely more than propinquity; one sound or style simply doesn't predict the next."

Christopher Thelen noted "While Naked City is certainly groundbreaking, it hardly is for everybody. The faint-hearted will be running for the exits before Zorn and crew can really get warmed up; purists of jazz, rock, and possibly even grindcore might consider the marriage of several styles of music sacrilegious. Possibly. But for the rest of us, Naked City represents unbridled energy, passion and possibly even anger channeled into music. The resulting noise is sheer joy to those who get it, and sheer madness to those who don't."

Pitchfork Media ranked this album at 47 on their Top 100 Albums of the 1980s list. Their review of The Complete Studio Recordings stated "On Naked City, Zorn introduced an amped-up surf/lounge/punk band featuring downtown New York's biggest talents, who blast and din through the 'James Bond' theme song, the theme to Chinatown, and a sound portrait of New Orleans' Latin Quarter – and then right when they slip into a groove, out of nowhere, the band launches punishing blasts of noise and catastrophe, flaming wreckage that blows up and collapses on a dime."

Track listing 
All compositions by John Zorn, unless otherwise noted.

Personnel 
 John Zorn – alto saxophone
 Bill Frisell – guitar
 Fred Frith – bass
 Joey Baron – drums
 Wayne Horvitz – keyboards
 Yamatsuka Eye – vocals

References 

1989 albums
Albums produced by John Zorn
Elektra Records albums
John Zorn albums
Naked City (band) albums
Nonesuch Records albums